The Ao, also known as the Dai, is the sixth longest river of Fujian province, China. It originates in the Jiufeng Mountains and flows into the East China Sea. The river has a total length of 137 km and  basin area of 2665 square kilometers.

References

Rivers of Fujian